Colleen Walker (August 16, 1956 – December 11, 2012) was an American professional golfer who played on the LPGA Tour.

Amateur career
Walker was born in Jacksonville, Florida. She started playing golf at the age of 14. At the age of 18, she was named the 1974 Palm Beach Post Athlete and Player of the Year. She won the Florida All-State Golf Award in 1976. She attended Florida State University where she won most valuable player honors from 1977–1978.

Professional career
Walker turned professional in September 1981 and played on the Tampa Bay Mini-Tour. She joined the LPGA Tour in 1982 after winning the LPGA Final Qualifying Tournament. She won nine tour titles, the first of them in 1987 and the last in 1997, including one major championship, the 1997 du Maurier Ltd. Classic. In 1988, she won the LPGA Vare Trophy for lowest scoring average, was named Most Improved Player by Golf Digest, and finished a career high fifth on the money list, one of four times she finished in the top ten. She was inducted into the Florida State University Hall of Fame in 1991 and the Palm Beach County Sports Hall of Fame in 2003.

Walker joined the Legends Tour in 2001, winning her first tournament that year. After being diagnosed with breast cancer in January 2003, she underwent chemotherapy and radiation. She would rejoin the tour in September. She finished in a tie for 10th at a senior event, essentially an attempt to see if she could still play. She retired from the LPGA Tour in 2004.

Walker died on December 11, 2012, in Valrico, Florida, of a cancer recurrence that was diagnosed in late 2011. She was 56.

Professional wins (12)

LPGA Tour (9)

LPGA Tour playoff record (1–0)

LPGA of Japan Tour (1)
 1989 Nichirei International

Legends Tour (1)
 2001 Hy-Vee Classic

Other (1)
 1988 Mazda Champions (with Dave Hill)

Major championships

Wins (1)

Team appearances
Professional
 Handa Cup (representing the United States): 2009 (winners)

References

External links

 

American female golfers
Florida State Seminoles women's golfers
LPGA Tour golfers
Winners of LPGA major golf championships
Golfers from Jacksonville, Florida
People from Valrico, Florida
Deaths from breast cancer
Deaths from cancer in Florida
1956 births
2012 deaths